The three-masted schooner Victory Chimes, also known as Edwin and Maud or Domino Effect, is a US National Historic Landmark. She is the last surviving Chesapeake Ram schooner. The boat on the Maine State Quarter is meant to resemble the Victory Chimes.

Construction 
Victory Chimes was built at Bethel, Delaware in 1900 by George K. Phillips Co. She was named Edwin and Maud after the children of her first Captain, Robert E. Riggen.

The traditional "ram" rig was a standing jib, flying jib, staysail (also called a forestaysail), foresail, mainsail and spanker (or mizzen), which Victory Chimes carries today. The heads of the fore, main and mizzen sails are supported by gaffs and the feet are laced to booms ... The standing rigging is steel wire. Standing rigging was minimal on rams, to enable deck cargo to be stowed on uncluttered decks.

She was designed to carry general cargo in the Chesapeake Bay. She was built with a centerboard, and a shallow draft for work in the Bay. Her centerboard, replaced in 1965, "draws 7 feet 6 inches with the centerboard up and 18 feet with the centerboard down."

Sailing career 
Edwin and Maude served in the cargo trade until 1945 carrying "sawn lumber, grain, soft coal and fertilizer." She was converted to carry passengers in 1946.

She was renamed Victory Chimes after purchase by a syndicate in 1954, for charter in Maine. In 1984, the ship was purchased by a Minnesota banker, Jerry Jubie, "for about $1 million", who brought her to Duluth, Minnesota. She was used for educational cruises for high school students, sold at auction in 1987, and sold again by Norwest Bank in 1988 to Thomas Monaghan, the owner of Domino's Pizza. Monaghan renamed her Domino Effect. He used the vessel for employee incentive cruises, and invested a considerable amount of money in restoring her with traditional methods at Sample's Shipyard in Boothbay Harbor. The ship returned to Maine in 1989, where she was purchased by Captain Kip Files and Captain Paul DeGaeta in 1990 for the passenger trade. They changed her name back to Victory Chimes. In 1997, it was reported that the vessel was operating as a traditional sailing ship, without an engine on board.

Just as when Victory Chimes was built, the schooner does not carry an engine. Maneuvering assistance is provided by a nineteen foot wooden yawlboat which pushes against the stern. When not in use it is towed astern. The current yawl boat was built in 1991 ... to enable the vessel to compete with other vessels in the passenger schooner trade which have been modified to carry engines. The yawlboat is ..."probably a bit bigger than would have originally been used." It is powered by a 135 horsepower Ford diesel engine. Three other boats are carried on davits.

As of 2010, Victory Chimes yawl boat Enoch was equipped with a 210 HP Cummins diesel engine. The donkey engine which retrieves the anchors and can be used to raise sail is a 6 hp single cylinder Seeger manufactured by Olds and installed in 1904.

National Historic Landmark 
The vessel was listed on the National Register of Historic Places in 1996 and was designated a National Historic Landmark in 1997.

See also
 List of schooners
 List of National Historic Landmarks in Maine
 National Register of Historic Places listings in Knox County, Maine
 List of oldest surviving ships

References

External links 

Press coverage of Victory Chimes

National Historic Landmarks in Maine
Ships on the National Register of Historic Places in Maine
Rockland, Maine
Transportation buildings and structures in Knox County, Maine
Symbols of Maine
Merchant ships of the United States
Individual sailing vessels
Ships built in Delaware
Chesapeake Bay boats
Schooners of the United States
Tall ships of the United States
Windjammers
1900 ships
Historic American Engineering Record in Maine
National Register of Historic Places in Knox County, Maine